POP1 may refer to:
POP1 (gene)
POP1, an early version of the Post Office Protocol